Sixteen members of the International Cricket Council (ICC) fielded teams at the 1998 Under-19 Cricket World Cup. Some information about squad members (including playing styles, dates of births, and even full names) is unavailable, especially for ICC associate members.

Group A

Denmark
Ten members of the Danish squad went on to play for the Danish senior team. One of those, Amjad Khan, also played at senior level for England. One Danish player, Freddie Klokker, was 14 years and 304 days at the start of the tournament, making him the youngest player whose age is definitely known. Denmark were competing in the Under-19 World Cup for the first time.

Ireland
Four members of the Irish squad went on to play for the Irish senior team. One of those, Ed Joyce, also played at senior level for England. Ireland were competing in the Under-19 World Cup for the first time.

Pakistan
Five members of the Pakistani squad went on to play for the Pakistani senior team, including one, Hasan Raza, who had already played at senior level before appearing in the World Cup. Another squad member, Imran Tahir, played at senior level for South Africa.

Sri Lanka
Four members of the Sri Lankan squad went on to play for the Sri Lankan senior team.

Group B

Australia
Three members of the Australian squad went on to play for the Australian senior team.

Coach:  Allan Border

Papua New Guinea
Eight members of the Papua New Guinean squad went on to play for the PNG senior team. Papua New Guinea were competing in the Under-19 World Cup for the first time.

West Indies
Six members of the West Indian squad went on to play for the West Indian senior team.

Zimbabwe
Seven members of the Zimbabwean squad went on to represent the Zimbabwean senior team. Zimbabwe were competing in the Under-19 World Cup for the first time.

Group C

India
Six members of the Indian squad went on to play for the Indian senior team.

Kenya
Seven members of the Kenyan squad went on to play for the Kenyan senior team including one, Thomas Odoyo, who had already played at senior level before appearing in the World Cup. Kenya were competing in the Under-19 World Cup for the first time.

Scotland
Seven members of the Scottish squad went on to play for the Scottish senior team. Scotland were competing in the Under-19 World Cup for the first time.

South Africa
Six members of the South African squad went on to play for the South African senior team. Two other squad members, Grant Elliott and Michael Lumb, went on to play at senior level for other international teams (New Zealand and England, respectively). South Africa were competing in the Under-19 World Cup for the first time.

Group D

Bangladesh
Seven members of the Bangladeshi squad went on to play for the Bangladesh senior team.
Source: ESPNcricinfo

England
Five members of the England squad went on to play for the England senior team.
Source: ESPNcricinfo

Namibia

Source: Namibia ESPNcricinfo

Nine members of the New Zealand squad went on to play for the New Zealand senior team.
Source: ESPNcricinfo

Sources
 Averages by team, MTN Under-19s World Cup 1997/98 – CricketArchive
 Records / ICC Under-19 World Cup, 1997/98 / Tournament statistics – ESPNcricinfo

References

ICC Under-19 Cricket World Cup squads
1998 ICC Under-19 Cricket World Cup